General elections were held in Namibia on 27 November 2019. Ballots were cast using electronic voting. A total of eleven candidates ran for the presidency and fifteen political parties contested the National Assembly elections.

Hage Geingob of SWAPO was re-elected to the presidency, although his vote share was reduced from 87% in 2014 to 56%, their lowest vote share for a presidential election in the party's history. SWAPO also retained their majority in the National Assembly, but lost their two-thirds supermajority.

Electoral system
The President of Namibia is elected using the two-round system; if no candidate receives more than 50% in the first round of voting, a run-off will be held. No previous presidential votes in Namibia have gone to a second round.

The 104 members of the National Assembly consist of 96 elected members and eight (non-voting) members appointed by the President. The 96 elected members are elected by closed list proportional representation from 14 multi-member constituencies based on the regions. Seats are allocated using the largest remainder method.

Political parties

SWAPO
SWAPO was viewed as the clear favorite going into the 2019 election, although the rise of new parties, such as the Landless People's Movement, was predicted to cause a split in the vote. In 2014, the ruling SWAPO Party announced a gender equality system where half of SWAPO's seats in parliament would be held by women. The party also embraced what it called a "zebra system", whereby if a minister was a woman, the deputy minister would be a man, and vice versa. Due to there being more male SWAPO MPs than female MPs, SWAPO put forward plans to expand parliament to remove the risk of male MPs losing their seats as a result of this gender equality policy. This change, raising the number of seats from 78 to 104, was enacted in 2014, although it was officially framed as allowing for wider representation of the population.

Opposition
Opposition parties had the objective of removing SWAPO's two-thirds majority in the National Assembly. The Namibian Economic Freedom Fighters (NEFF) and the Republican Party (RP), both without a realistic chance in the previous elections, withdrew their presidential candidates in early November and instead endorsed the independent candidate Panduleni Itula. The United Democratic Front (UDF) in turn withdrew their candidate to back McHenry Venaani, presidential candidate of the Popular Democratic Movement (PDM) and leader of the official opposition. In August 2019, the two parties signed a coalition agreement for the coming legislative period, allocating parliamentary seats 6, 13 and 18 to the UPM, and the others to PDM, in an entity to be known as the PDM-UPM coalition. The Rally for Democracy and Progress (RDP) formed a coalition with the Christian Democratic Voice (CDV), both parties supported Mike Kavekotora of the RDP.

Parties that contested the legislative election  
The following parties fielded candidates to contest the legislative election:

Campaign
Ten candidates contested the presidential elections, with Hage Geingob of SWAPO widely expected to win a second term as president. For the first time, an independent candidate, Panduleni Itula, ran for president. Esther Muinjangue of the National Unity Democratic Organisation (NUDO) was the first female presidential candidate in Namibia.

Results

President
Hage Geingob won the presidential election and received a second term as president. His percentage of votes gained, however, dropped significantly from 87% in 2014 to 56% in 2019. While rural areas predominantly supported Geingob, many urban centres voted for the independent candidate, Panduleni Itula, who received 29% of the overall votes. No other candidate achieved a two-digit result.

National Assembly 
SWAPO, yet again, won a majority of seats in the National Assembly, but closely missed the threshold for a two-thirds majority, which it held since 1994. Consequently, opposition parties also gained seats, most prominently the PDM, which obtained 16 seats in the National Assembly. The PDM's 16.60% vote share is its best electoral performance since the 1994 election.

Legal challenge
Runner-up Itula challenged the outcome of the elections in court, based on the Electoral Act of 2014 that allows electronic voting machines (EVMs) only in combination with a Verifiable Paper Trail (VPPT). For the Namibian elections in 2014, 2015 and now 2019, EVMs without a paper trail were used after Charles Namoloh, the responsible minister at the time, enacted the law without the paper trail provision. The Supreme Court of Namibia ruled in February 2020 that this enactment was unconstitutional because it violates the separation of powers. The court, however, declined to set aside the elections carried out using such failed process, as there were no indications the devices were tampered with. This has attracted some controversy.

References

Presidential elections in Namibia
Election, general
Namibia
Elections in Namibia
National Assembly (Namibia)
November 2019 events in Africa
Supreme Court of Namibia